Edward Smith (June 17, 1913 – January 29, 1998) was an American football running back in the National Football League for the Boston Redskins and Green Bay Packers.  He played college football at New York University and was drafted in the third round of the 1936 NFL Draft.

During the 1935 football season, Smith posed for the Heisman Trophy study with the now-iconic straight or "stiff" arm.

Sculptor Frank Eliscu asked Smith, his former high school classmate, to pose for a commissioned work involving a football player.  They both attended George Washington High School in New York City's Washington Heights neighborhood. Smith did not realize that the sculpture, for which he posed, became the fabled Heisman Trophy until 1982.  A documentary filmmaker tracked down Smith through his brother-in-law, Bob Pastor, a former heavyweight boxer who fought Joe Louis twice.  The Downtown Athletic Club subsequently presented Smith with a Heisman Trophy of his own in 1985.

Smith was what sportswriters used to refer to as a triple-threat: he ran, passed and often quick-kicked in New York University's single-wing offense during the 1933–1935 seasons. Smith suffered a torn ligament in his left leg and a hemorrhage in his right leg and NYU went 3–4–1 in 1934. The 1935 Thanksgiving game was the last of Smith's collegiate career.   The first Heisman Trophy presentation was on December 5, 1935.

The Boston Redskins drafted Smith in the NFL's first ever draft in February 1936.  He was selected in round three, the #20 pick overall.  Smith graduated from NYU in the spring of 1936 and proceeded to a career in professional football.  The pay was $200 a game for the twelve-week season.

Smith played with the Redskins in the 1936 season.  The Redskins played in the 1936 NFL Championship Game at New York's Polo Grounds on December 13, 1936.  The Skins lost to the Green Bay Packers 21-6.  Smith played with the Green Bay Packers under coach Curly Lambeau in the 1937 season.  His ligament injury returned while playing in Green Bay and Smith left professional sports.  He later played and coached semi-pro football in Springfield, Massachusetts in 1941.  As player-coach, Smith again connected with Vince Lombardi, who played under Smith.

Smith and his wife Hilda lived most of their life in Washington Heights. Smith worked for Otis Elevator in the post-war era.

References

1913 births
1998 deaths
American football running backs
Boston Redskins players
George Washington Educational Campus alumni
Green Bay Packers players
NYU Violets football players
Players of American football from New York City